Magul Maha Viharaya is an ancient Buddhist temple situated in Lahugala, Ampara District of Sri Lanka. The temple lies on the northern edge of the Lahugala National Park, about 22 km off from Siyambalanduwa town and about 11 km off Pottuvil town. Lahugala has been part of the Kingdom of Ruhuna in ancient Sri Lanka. The ruins of Magul Maha Vihara are one of the major tourist attractions of the Eastern province. This temple is also an archaeologically protected monument of the country.

History and legends
The history of Magul Maha Vihara possibly dates back to the period of King Kavantissa (205-161 BC) who ruled the Kingdom of Ruhuna in ancient Sri Lanka. There are evidence that suggests that the king has built this temple in the 2nd Century BC on the exact location where he married the princesses Viharamahadevi, the daughter of king Kelani Tissa. Other sources claim that King Dhatusena (463-479 AD) built this temple while many other monarchs renovated it through the centuries later. There is a stone inscription at the site of this temple that dates back to the 14th century which supports the latter view.

According to legend Viharamaha Devi, the daughter of King Kelanitissa volunteered to sacrifice herself to the sea to appease the gods who were enraged at the King for punishing an innocent monk. The princess was safely carried over the ocean waves, reaching ashore at a place near the Muhudu Maha Viharaya in Pottuvil, where the encounter between king Kavantissa and the princess took place which later led to their marriage. The legend also tells that the marriage ceremony was conducted at the premises of Magul Maha Viharaya in Lahugala, where the King had later built the temple to celebrate the auspicious event. The foundations of the Magul Maduwa where the wedding ceremony took place can still be seen at the temple premises. Magul is a word in native Sinhala language which gives the meaning wedding or auspicious.

Magul Maha Vihara had been renovated by several monarchs after its establishment. A 14th century stone inscription, located within the temple premises, reveals about a queen who also had the name Viharamaha Devi, wife of King Buvenekabahu IV of Gampola and Parakramabahu V of Gampola, who renovated and donated many acres of land to this temple. Magul Maha Viharaya is inscribed in this stone inscription as Ruhunu Maha Viharaya. Some other sources reveals that king Dappula I (661-664 AD), constructed this temple after listening to the preachings of Buddhist monks. It is speculated that around 12,000 monks inhabited the complex at some stage in history, which is evident to the largeness of the ancient temple.

Ruins and surroundings
Presently a significant amount of ruins of the ancient temple can be seen at the location. The image shrine, the Bodhi Tree (sacred fig) and the stupa are all in a good state of preservation. The main gate, a solidly built wall that surrounds all the buildings and the remains of a small shrine with an unusual moonstone at its entrance are some of the structures that can be seen at the site today. The elephants on this moonstone all have riders on their backs, something unseen in all other Sri Lankan moonstones. The stupa of Lahugala Magul Maha Vihara is built on a high terrace with three staircases leading up to it. There are images of grand lion guardians at the top of these stairs. 

The causeway which is used to approach Magul Maha Vihara is situated across a lotus filled reservoir which surrounds the entire temple complex. The entire temple complex had covered an extent of around 10,000 acres where ruins of a palace, moonstone, monastery, bo-maluwa, stupas, ponds etc. are found scattered all over. These and all the other ruins at Lahugala are all surrounded by the forests of the Lahugala National Park, which is an important habitat for animals such as elephants, sambars, deers, leopards and many endemic birds of Sri Lanka.

Vihara inscriptions

Magul Maha Vihara slab inscription 1

Magul Maha Vihara slab inscription 2

Magul Maha Vihara pillar inscription

See also
 Muhudu Maha Viharaya

References

External links

 Raja Maha Viharaya, Lahugala - Ampara
 Lahugala Magul Maha Viharaya (Buddhist places in Sri Lanka)

Buddhist temples in Ampara District
Stupas in Sri Lanka
Archaeological protected monuments in Ampara District
Sri Lanka inscriptions